Isabella of Austria (18 July 1501 – 19 January 1526), also known as Elizabeth, was Queen of Denmark, Norway and Sweden as the wife of King Christian II. She was the daughter of King Philip I and Queen Joanna of Castile and the sister of Emperor Charles V. She ruled Denmark as regent in 1520.

Childhood

Isabella was born on 18 July 1501 in Brussels as the third child of Philip the Handsome, ruler of the Burgundian Netherlands and Joanna the Mad, heiress to the Spanish kingdoms of Castile and Aragon. Her father was the son of the reigning Holy Roman Emperor Maximilian I and his deceased consort Mary, Duchess of Burgundy, while her mother was the daughter of the Catholic Monarchs Ferdinand of Aragon and Isabella I of Castile. She was baptized in Brussels by the Bishop of Cambrai, Henri de Berghes.

She had two older siblings, Eleanor and Charles, as well as three younger siblings Ferdinand, Mary and Catherine. Isabella and her siblings were considered the "noblest children" of her time. Her brothers became the most powerful men in Europe as Holy Roman Emperors. Her sisters became queens in Portugal and France, Bohemia and Hungary, and Portugal, respectively.

After the early death of Isabella's father in September 1506, her mother's mental health began to deteriorate. Isabella, along with her brother, Charles, and her sisters, Eleanor and Mary, was put into the care of her paternal aunt, Archduchess Margaret, while the two other siblings, Ferdinand and Catherine, remained in Castile. Eleanor, Isabella, and Mary were educated together at their aunt's court in Mechelen. 

Isabella's fortune, her succession rights, and her connections made her a valuable pawn in the royal marriage market. The king of Denmark had first intended to marry her eldest sister Eleanor of Austria, but the Habsburgs considered Eleanor too valuable for the throne of Denmark, because as the eldest sister, there was a likelihood that her progeny may succeed. Therefore, Isabella was selected for the Danish king.

On 11 July 1514, one week short of her 13th birthday, Isabella was married by proxy to King Christian II of Denmark with Emperor Maximilian I, her grandfather, standing in for the king. She remained in the Netherlands, but is said to have fallen in love with her spouse at the sight of his painting, and asked to be taken to Denmark. A year after the wedding, the Archbishop of Nidaros was sent to escort her to Copenhagen. The marriage was ratified on 12 August 1515 (she was 14 years old).

Queen

Isabella was crowned Queen of Denmark and Norway and began using another version of her name, Elisabeth, but the relationship between her and her new family and Christian was quite cool during the first years of the marriage. The King's Dutch mistress, Dyveke Sigbritsdatter, had been with him since 1507, and he was not about to give her up for a teenager. Dyveke's mother, Sigbrit Willoms, was also influential at court, and Isabella was given less influence than both of them. This angered the Emperor, and caused some diplomatic strife between him and King Christian, but the matter was resolved when Dyveke died in 1517, and Isabella's relationship with her husband improved vastly over the next few years; her relationship with Sigbrit Willoms improved as well, and both women acted as political advisors to the king. From 1516, Anne Meinstrup was head lady-in-waiting of her court.

In 1520, Christian took the throne of Sweden, thereby making Isabella Queen of Sweden. After taking Stockholm, he asked the Swedish representatives to turn it and the regency of Sweden over to Isabella if he himself should die when his children were minors. She was to be the last Queen of Sweden who was also Queen of Denmark during the Kalmar union, but she in fact never visited Sweden; pregnant at the time of her spouse's accession to the throne of Sweden, she did not follow him there. Isabella served as the regent of Denmark during Christian's stay in Sweden. Her husband was deposed as king of Sweden the following year.  King Christian imprisoned many Swedish noblewomen, related to rebellious Swedish nobles, at the infamous Blåtårn ("Blue Tower") of Copenhagen Castle, including Christina Gyllenstierna, Cecilia Månsdotter and Margareta Eriksdotter Vasa. Gustav I of Sweden used their purported harsh treatment in captivity in his propaganda against Christian II and claimed that the Danish monarch starved the women and children, who only survived by the mercy shown to them by the queen of Denmark, Isabella of Austria. 

When King Christian was deposed in 1523 by disloyal noblemen supporting his uncle, Duke Frederick, the new king wanted to be on good terms with Isabella's family. He wrote her a personal letter in her native German, offering her a dowager queen's pension and permitting her to stay in Denmark under his protection while King Christian fled to the Low Countries. But Isabella replied in Latin "ubi rex meus, ibi regnum meum" ("where my king is, there is my kingdom").

Exile

Isabella left Denmark with her husband and their children after her husband was deposed in 1523 and travelled to the Netherlands. Isabella and Christian travelled around Germany in an attempt to gain help for Christian's restoration to the throne. Isabella made her own negotiations with her relatives, and also accompanied her husband on his travels. They visited Saxony in 1523 and Berlin in 1523–1524. In Berlin, Isabella became interested in the teachings of Luther, and felt sympathy for Protestantism, however she never converted officially. When she visited Nürnberg in 1524, she received communion in the Protestant way, which so enraged her birth family, the Habsburgs, that Christian decided that she should hide her Protestant views in the future, for political reasons.

In the spring of 1525, Isabella caught some kind of serious illness, which worsened after she travelled through a storm later that year, and lasted all summer. The former queen died at the castle of Zwijnaarde near Ghent aged twenty-four. She received both Protestant and Catholic communion, but the Habsburgs declared that she had died a convinced Catholic. Her religious sympathies, and whether she was a Protestant or a Catholic after 1524, have been debated. At her deathbed, she gave the cause of her husband's restoration to her aunt, the regent of the Netherlands, Margaret of Austria.

Her fifteenth generation great-granddaughter, Princess Isabella of Denmark, was named after her.

Cultural depictions

Literature
 Bruden fra Gent – a 2003 historic novel by Dorrit Willumsen about King Christian II, Dyveke and mother Sigbrit, and about the marriage in 1515 with the only 14-year-old Elisabeth.

Issue

Ancestry

References

 Kvindebiografisk Leksikon  (Danish)

|-

|-

1501 births
1526 deaths
Nobility from Brussels
16th-century House of Habsburg
Regents of Denmark
16th-century women rulers
Danish Roman Catholics
Danish royal consorts
Norwegian royal consorts
Swedish queens
Austrian Roman Catholics
Austrian princesses
Spanish infantas
Aragonese infantas
Castilian infantas
Burials at St. Canute's Cathedral
Spanish people of Austrian descent
Christian II of Denmark
Royal reburials
Daughters of kings